Tembekile "Tembi" Locke is an American actress who has appeared in television shows and film. She is best known as Dr. Grace Monroe on Syfy's series Eureka and as Dr. Diana Davis in Sliders. Locke is also the author of the bestselling memoir, From Scratch, which was later adapted into a limited series by Netflix.

Life and career
Born to civil rights activist parents, she attended Alief Hastings High School in Houston. After high school, Locke lived for a time in Italy on a foreign exchange program. While there, she appeared several times on Italian television, including the Carnevale Di Venezia. After returning to the United States, she graduated with an art history degree from Wesleyan University, in Connecticut. She speaks fluent Italian.

Locke and her husband, Rosario "Saro" Gullo, a Sicilian chef, lived and worked in Los Angeles, California. Her husband died in 2012.  They have one daughter who was 7 at the time of her father's death. She is a vegetarian, and urban homesteader, regularly growing produce on vacant lots in the city. Locke is a gourmet cook, and also enjoys hiking, running and fishing. She is involved in several social activism programs.

Career
While in New York, Locke appeared in several off-Broadway productions, and landed a role on the long-running soap opera As The World Turns. Afterward, she moved to Los Angeles.  Her prime-time television career began by playing one of Will Smith's love interests on The Fresh Prince of Bel-Air.

Locke has appeared in numerous television dramas, comedies, and films over the course of her career. She played Dr. Grace Monroe, a biotech specialist, on seasons four and five of Syfy's series EURKA (2010–2012). She also starred as Dr. Diana Davis on season five of the Fox/Syfy show Sliders (1999–2000).

Locke's television work includes shows such as Castle, Bones, The Mentalist, Windfall, CSI: NY, and Beverly Hills, 90210. Her comedic turns include Friends, The Jamie Foxx Show, House of Payne, Like Family, and Raising Dad, among others. She has appeared in a number of movies made for television, including Black Widow, Final Approach and Born in the USA. In 2014, Locke appeared as Dr. Walcott in Dumb and Dumber To.

As of October 2018, her most recent work is in the second installment of Hulu original "Into the Dark" series. She plays the therapist in the episode Flesh & Blood.

Locke's memoir, From Scratch: A Memoir of Love, Sicily and Finding Home (published April 30, 2019), is about her romance with her Italian husband and her grief after his untimely death. From Scratch was later adapted by producer Reese Witherspoon and writer Marguerite MacIntyre into a limited series starring Zoe Saldana for Hello Sunshine, 3 Arts, Cinestar and Netflix.

Filmography

Film

Television

References

External links
 Official Web page

Living people
American television actresses
Actresses from Houston
Wesleyan University alumni
African-American actresses
American film actresses
20th-century American actresses
21st-century American actresses
20th-century African-American women
20th-century African-American people
21st-century African-American women
21st-century African-American people
Year of birth missing (living people)